Alaska Natives (also known as Alaskan Natives, Native Alaskans, Indigenous Alaskans, Aboriginal Alaskans or First Alaskans) are the indigenous peoples of Alaska and include Iñupiat, Yupik, Aleut, Eyak, Tlingit, Haida, Tsimshian, and a number of Northern Athabaskan cultures. They are often defined by their language groups. Many Alaska Natives are enrolled in federally recognized Alaska Native tribal entities, who in turn belong to 13 Alaska Native Regional Corporations, who administer land and financial claims.

Ancestors of Native Alaskans or Alaska Natives migrated into the area thousands of years ago, in at least two different waves. Some are descendants of the third wave of migration, in which people settled across the northern part of North America. They never migrated to southern areas. For this reason, genetic studies show they are not closely related to native peoples in South America. Alaska Natives came from Asia. Anthropologists have stated that their journey from Asia to Alaska was made possible through the Bering land bridge or by traveling through the sea. Throughout the Arctic and the circumpolar north, the ancestors of Alaska Natives established varying indigenous, complex cultures that have succeeded each other over time. They developed sophisticated ways to deal with the challenging climate and environment. Historic groups have been defined by their languages, which belong to several major language families. Today, Alaska Natives or Native Alaskans constitute more than 20% of the population of Alaska.

List of peoples

Below is a full list of the different Alaska Native or Native Alaskan peoples, who are largely defined by their historic languages (within each culture are different tribes):

Ancient Beringian
Alaskan Athabaskans
Ahtna
Deg Hit'an
Dena'ina
Eskimo
Eyak
Gwich'in
Haida
Hän
Holikachuk
Koyukon
Lower Tanana
Tanacross
Upper Tanana
Upper Kuskokwim (Kolchan)
Tlingit
Tsimshian
Iñupiat, an Inuit group
Yupik
Siberian Yupik
Yup'ik
Cup'ik
Nunivak Cup'ig
Sugpiaq ~ Alutiiq
Chugach Sugpiaq
 Koniag Alutiiq
Aleut (Unangan)

Demographics 
The Alaska Natives Commission estimated there were about 86,000 Alaska Natives living in Alaska in 1990, with another 17,000 who lived outside Alaska. A 2013 study by the Alaska Department of Labor and Workforce Development documented more than 120,000 Alaska Native people in Alaska.  While the majority of Native Alaskans live in small villages or remote regional hubs such as Nome, Dillingham, and Bethel, the percentage who live in urban areas has been increasing. In 2010, 44% lived in urban areas, compared to 38% in the 2000 census. As of 2018, natives constitute 15.4% of the overall Alaskan population.

History
The modern history of Alaska Natives begins with the first contact between Alaskan First Nations and Russians sailing from Siberia in the eighteenth century. British and American traders, coming mostly from eastern settlements in North America, generally did not reach the area until the nineteenth century. In some cases, Christian missionaries were not active in Alaska until the twentieth century.

Russian colonial period
During an expedition, Vitus Bering spotted Alaska. Native Alaskans first came into contact with Russians in the 18th century. Time of contact with Russians varied throughout each native group since the Native Alaskan groups were spread throughout Alaska. Arriving from Siberia by ship in the mid-eighteenth century, Russians began to trade with Alaska Natives in what became known as the Aleutian Islands. They started new settlements around trading posts, and Russian Orthodox missionaries were part of these. The Russian missionaries were the first persons to translate Christian scripture into Native languages, such as Tlingit. In the 21st century, the numerous congregations of Russian Orthodox Christians in Alaska reflect this early history, as they are generally composed mostly of Alaska Natives.

Rather than hunting and harvesting marine life themselves, the Sibero-Russian promyshlenniki forced the Aleuts to do the work for them, enserfing the Aleuts. As word spread of the riches in furs to be had, competition among Russian companies increased. Catherine the Great, who became Empress in 1763, proclaimed good will toward the Aleut and urged her subjects to treat them fairly. The growing competition between the trading companies, which merged into fewer, larger and more powerful corporations, created conflicts that aggravated the relations with the indigenous populations. Over the years, the situation became catastrophic for the Aleuts, as well as other Native Alaskan people who were impacted by Russian contact.

As the animal populations declined, the Aleuts, already dependent on the new barter economy created by their fur trade with the Russians, were increasingly coerced into taking greater risks in the dangerous waters of the North Pacific to hunt for more otter. As the Shelikhov-Golikov Company and later Russian-American Company developed as a monopoly, it used skirmishes and systematic violence as a tool of colonial exploitation of the indigenous people. When the Aleut revolted and won some victories, the Russians retaliated, killing many. They also destroyed the peoples' boats and hunting gear, leaving them no means of survival.

The greatest mortality was caused by the Aleuts' encounters with new diseases: during the first two generations (1741/1759-1781/1799 AD) of Russian contact, 80 percent of the Aleut population died from Eurasian infectious diseases. These had been endemic among the Europeans for centuries, but the Aleut had no immunity against the new diseases.

Effects of Russian colonization 

The Russian Tsarist government expanded into Indigenous territory in present-day Alaska for its own geopolitical reasons. It consumed natural resources of the territory during the trading years, and Russian Orthodoxy was evangelized. Their movement into these populated areas of Indigenous communities altered the demographic and natural landscape.

Historians have suggested that the Russian-American Company exploited Indigenous peoples as a source of inexpensive labor. The Russian-American Company not only used Indigenous populations for labor during the fur trade, but also held some as hostages to acquire iasak. Iasak, a form of taxation imposed by the Russians, was a tribute in the form of otter pelts. It was a taxation method the Russians had previously found useful in their early encounter with Indigenous communities of Siberia during the Siberian fur trade. Beaver pelts were also customary to be given to fur traders upon first contact with various communities.

The Russian-American Company used military force on Indigenous families, taking them as hostage until  male community members produced furs for them. Otter furs on Kodiak Island and Aleutian Islands enticed the Russians to start these taxations. Robbery and maltreatment in the form of corporal punishment and the withholding of food was also present upon the arrival of fur traders. Catherine the Great dissolved the giving of tribute in 1799, but her government initiated mandatory conscription of Indigenous men between the ages of 18 to 50 to become seal hunters strictly for the Russian American Company. This mandatory labor gave the Russian American Company an edge in competition with American and British fur traders. But the conscription separated men from their families and villages, thus altering and breaking down communities. With able-bodied men away on the hunt, villages were left with little protection as only women, children, and the elderly remained behind.

In addition to changes that came with conscription, the spread of disease also altered the populations of Indigenous communities. Although records kept in the period were scarce, it has been said that 80% of the pre-contact population of the Aleut people were gone by 1800.

Relationships between Indigenous women and fur traders increased as Indigenous men were away from villages. This resulted in marriages and children that would come to be known as Creole peoples, children who were Indigenous and Russian. To reduce hostilities with Aleutian communities, it became policy for fur traders to enter into marriage with Indigenous women. The Creole population increased in the territory controlled by the Russian American Company.

The growth of the Russian Orthodox Church was another important tactic in the colonization and conversion of Indigenous populations. Ioann Veniaminov, who later became Saint Innocent of Alaska, was an important missionary who carried out the Orthodox Church's agenda to Christianize Indigenous populations. The church encouraged Creole children to follow Russian Orthodox Christianity, while the Russian American Company provided them with an education. Creole people were believed to have high levels of loyalty toward the Russian crown and Russian American Company. After completing their education, children were often sent to Russia, where they would study skills such as mapmaking, theology, and military intelligence.  In the 1850's Russia lost much of its interest on Alaska.

American colonialism 

Alaska has many natural resources, which, including its gold, caught the attention of the United States. In 1867, the United States purchased Alaska from Russia. It did not consider the wishes of Native Alaskans or view them as citizens. The land that belonged to Alaska Natives was considered to be "open land", which could be claimed by white settlers without redress to the Alaska Natives living there. The only schools for Alaska Natives were those founded by religious missionaries.  Most white settlers did not understand the sophisticated cultures the Alaska Natives had developed to live in that challenging place and considered them to be inferior to European Americans. The Americans imposed racial segregation and what were effectively Jim Crow laws applied against the Alaska Natives and treating them as second-class residents. Since Jim Crow law were imposed, it led to segregation amongst Alaskan Natives and Americans. Buildings would even have signs saying that no natives were allowed. There were also segregated schools. In 1880, there was a court case where a child was not allowed to attend a school with Americans because his step father was native. A child that was part native and part American would only be allowed to attend a school with American children if the family has abandoned their culture. This means that they could no longer speak their native language, wear traditional native clothing, be amongst other natives, eat native foods, or practice any native religion.

In 1912, the Alaska Native Brotherhood (ANB) was formed to help fight for citizenship rights. The Alaska Native Sisterhood (ANS) was created in 1915. Also in 1915, the Alaska Territorial legislature passed a law allowing Alaskan Natives the right to vote – but on the condition that they give up their cultural customs and traditions. The Indian Citizenship Act, passed in 1924, gave all Native Americans United States citizenship.

ANB began to hold a great deal of political power in the 1920s. They protested the segregation of Alaska Natives in public areas and institutions, and also staged boycotts. Alberta Schenck (Inupiaq) staged a well-publicized protest against segregation in a movie theater in 1944. With the help of Elizabeth Peratrovich (Tlingit), the Alaska Equal Rights Act of 1945 was passed, ending segregation in Alaska.

In 1942, during World War II, the United States forced evacuation of around nine hundred Aleuts from the Aleutian Islands. The idea was to remove the Aleuts from a potential combat zone during World War II for their own protection, but European Americans living in the same area were not forced to leave. The removal was handled so poorly that many Aleuts died after they were evacuated; the elderly and children had the highest mortality rates.  Survivors returned to the islands to find their homes and possessions destroyed or looted.

Alaska became part of the United States in 1959 upon President Dwight D. Eisenhower recognizing Alaska as the 49th state.

ANCSA and since (1971 to present)
 
In 1971, with the support of Alaska Native leaders such as Emil Notti, Willie Hensley, and Byron Mallott, the U.S. Congress passed the Alaska Native Claims Settlement Act (ANCSA), which settled land and financial claims for lands and resources which the Alaska Natives had lost to European-Americans. It provided for the establishment of thirteen Alaska Native Regional Corporations to administer those claims. Similar to the separately defined status of the Canadian Inuit and First Nations in Canada, which are recognized as distinct peoples, in the United States, Alaska Natives or Native Alaskans are in some respects treated separately by the government from other Native Americans in the United States. This is in part related to their interactions with the U.S. government which occurred in a different historic period than its interactions during the period of westward expansion during the 19th century.

Europeans and Americans did not have sustained encounters with the Alaska Natives until the late nineteenth and early twentieth centuries when many were attracted to the region in gold rushes. The Alaska Natives were not allotted individual title in severalty to land under the Dawes Act of 1887 but were instead treated under the Alaska Native Allotment Act of 1906.

It was repealed in 1971, following ANSCA, at which time reservations were ended. Another characteristic difference is that Alaska Native tribal governments do not have the power to collect taxes for business transacted on tribal land, per the United States Supreme Court decision in Alaska v. Native Village of Venetie Tribal Government (1998). Except for the Tsimshian, Alaska Natives no longer hold reservations but do control some lands. Under the Marine Mammal Protection Act of 1972, Alaska Natives are reserved the right to harvest whales and other marine mammals.

Climate change

Four indigenous tribes in Alaska, the Shishmaref, Kivalina, Shaktoolik and Newtok tribes, are being considered the first climate refugees for America, due to sea ice melting and increased wildfires in the regions (Bronen and Brubaker). The effects of climate change on the people of Alaska are extensive and include issues such as increased vulnerability to disease, mental health issues, injury, food insecurity, and water insecurity (Brubaker). According to the Environmental Protection Agency (EPA), the loss of sea ice will increase erosion area and further displace more native communities. The melting sea ice will also affect the migration of some animals that the tribes rely on and with the ice melting there will be no place to store the food that they do obtain (EPA). Due to the permafrost melting, the infrastructure that has been around in the past will become unstable and native villages will collapse (EPA). 
	
The Shishmaref, Kivalina, Shaktoolik and Newtok tribes are located on the west coast of Alaska and due to sea-level rise the villages are experiencing more severe storm surges that are eroding their coastlines (Bronen). There is no land for these tribes to move to that are already in the area they live in which forces these communities to migrate and change their whole way of living (Bronen). It is predicted that a climate event will submerge the tribes completely in less than fifteen years (Bronen).

Extreme weather conditions has increased the risk of injury, usually there are thick layers of ice all year long but due to increasing temperatures in the atmosphere and the sea the ice in becoming thinner and is increasing the number of people who fall through the ice, if a person survives falling through the ice they are faced with other health concerns (Brubaker). Increased water insecurity and failing infrastructure caused by climate change has created sanitation issues which has increased the amount of respiratory illnesses in many regions in Alaska, in 2005 pneumonia was the leading cause of hospitalizations (Brubaker). Many of the affected tribes are experiencing increased mental stress due to climate change and the problem of relocating but no policy or way to relocate (Brubaker). Stress has also increased on villages who face infrastructure damage due to melting permafrost, there are almost no regulations other than the Alaskan government recommended not building on permafrost or using extra layers of insulation that is used on foundation walls (EPA). Food insecurity has also created stress and health issues, families can not get enough food due to animals also relocating to get to a climate that is more suitable to them (Brubaker). Families also do not have a secure food system because their ways of storing food, underground ice cellar, are no longer frozen year long due to climate change, their cellars thaw in the summers leaving their food supply inedible.

Subsistence

Gathering of subsistence food continues to be an important economic and cultural activity for many Alaska Natives.  In Utqiaġvik, Alaska, in 2005, more than 91 percent of the Iñupiat households which were interviewed still participated in the local subsistence economy, compared with the approximately 33 percent of non-Iñupiat households who used wild resources obtained from hunting, fishing, or gathering.

But, unlike many tribes in the contiguous United States, Alaska Natives or Native Alaskans do not have treaties with the United States that protect their subsistence rights, except for the right to harvest whales and other marine mammals. The Alaska Native Claims Settlement Act explicitly extinguished aboriginal hunting and fishing rights in the state of Alaska.

See also

 List of Alaska Native Tribal Entities, the list of Native Villages and other "tribal entities" recognized by the US Bureau of Indian Affairs.
 Prehistory of Alaska
 First Alaskans Institute
 Indigenous Amerindian genetics
 Circumpolar peoples
 Indigenous peoples of the Pacific Northwest Coast
 Indigenous peoples of the Subarctic
Alaska Native Language Center

References

Sources

Further reading
 Chythlook-Sifsof, Callan J. "Native Alaska, Under Threat." (Op-Ed) The New York Times. June 27, 2013.

External links

Alaska Federation of Natives
Alaska Native Health Board
Alaska Native Heritage Center
First Alaskans Institute
Tlingit National Anthem, Alaska Natives Online
Arctic Studies Center

 

American culture